Government Arts and Science College is a college in Karwar, India. It is a First Grade College, affiliated to Karnatak University Dharwad. It was established in 1961.

History 
It was started as Shri Keshav Gajanan Sabnis (K.G.S) Arts and Science College by Academy of General Education (A.G.E) Karwar in June 1961 and taken over by Government of Karnataka in June 1977. 

In 1961 when this college was established, it was the second college in the District to cater to the higher learning needs of the poorer and rural people of the area and its take over by the Government of Karnataka in 1977 opened the gates of higher learning for the poorest of the poor, downtrodden and backward classes of the society owing to reservations in admissions and cheaper fee structure. The primary objective of the institution is the intellectual, economic, spiritual, moral, physical, cultural and social enlistment of the local community.

Principals 
 Shetgeri
 D.T.Joshi
 Kalgudari
 Dr.Kalpana K (present principal)

Notable alumni
 Shantaram Siddi, member of the Karnataka Legislative Council

Notable faculty 
 Akbar Ali

Colleges in Karnataka
Education in Karwar
Karnatak University
Universities and colleges in Uttara Kannada district